Matt Harmon (born April 4, 1985) is an American professional golfer. He is from Grand Rapids, Michigan.  He attended Michigan State University and was the 2007 Big Ten Conference "Player of the Year" for men's golf. Harmon is sponsored by  Team Power Group, (Dewey, OK, The Fishel Company) and Comstar Supply, INC. (Collegeville, PA). 

He has competed in the 2007, 2008, and 2009 PGA Tour's Buick Invitational.  His best finish came in 2009 where he finished tied for 52nd place.

He has also competed in the PGA's developmental Nationwide Tour and the NGA Hooters Tour.  He has a total of 4 professional wins on the NGA Hooters Tour.

Harmon qualified for the 2013 U.S. Open at Merion Golf Club. Harmon won the 2014 SIGA Dakota Dunes Open. He finished second on the PGA Tour Canada Order of Merit to earn a Web.com Tour card for 2015.

Professional wins (5)

PGA Tour Canada wins (1)

NGA Hooters Tour wins (4)
2010 Buffalo Run Casino Classic 
three other wins

References

External links

Profile on ESPN Golf

American male golfers
Michigan State Spartans men's golfers
PGA Tour golfers
Golfers from Michigan
People from Grand Haven, Michigan
Sportspeople from Grand Rapids, Michigan
1985 births
Living people